Retribution is an upcoming thriller film directed by Nimród Antal and starring Liam Neeson.  It is a remake of the 2015 Spanish film El desconocido.

Cast
Liam Neeson as Matt Turner 
Jack Champion
Lilly Aspell
Matthew Modine
Embeth Davidtz
Arian Moayed
Noma Dumezweni
Emily Kusche as Mila
Antonije Stankovic as Young Protestor
Daniel Grave as Male Phone Voice
Christian Koerner as Police Officer

Production
Retribution is an American-German-Spanish co-production by Studiocanal and Studio Babelsberg Motion Pictures. It was shot mainly at Babelsberg Studios in Potsdam and in the streets of Berlin, where the story takes place.

Neeson was cast as the lead in November 2020. In May 2021, it was announced that Champion and Aspell were cast to portray the son and daughter of Neeson's character respectively. In June 2021, it was announced that Modine, Davidtz and Moayed were cast in the film. In July 2021, Deadline Hollywood reported that Modine completed his scenes that were filmed in Germany.

References

External links
 

American remakes of Spanish films
Upcoming films
StudioCanal films
Films shot in Germany
Vaca Films films
Atresmedia Cine films